Walt Disney's Classic Cartoon Favorites is a series of DVDs by Walt Disney Home Entertainment. Each release would feature around one hour of Disney animated short films, grouped by a starring character or a theme. It is based on the original Walt Disney Cartoon Classics line of videotapes of the 1980s. As opposed to the chronological nature of the Walt Disney Treasures line, each release would feature various cartoons in no particular order. The series featured a total of four waves of releases, between January 11, 2005 and April 11, 2006. Another very similar line was Walt Disney's Funny Factory.

Releases

Wave One
The first wave of four releases came on January 11, 2005. Each release focuses on a particular character, or pair of characters.

Volume 1: Starring Mickey
All of the shorts on here feature Mickey Mouse.
Mickey's Circus (1936)
Mickey's Garden (1935)
The Little Whirlwind (1941)
On Ice (1935)
Hawaiian Holiday (1937)
Moving Day (1936)
Orphan's Picnic (1936)

Volume 2: Starring Donald
All of the shorts on here feature Donald Duck.
Inferior Decorator (1948)
Don Donald (1937)
Golden Eggs (1941)
Bee at the Beach (1950)
Donald's Dog Laundry (1940)
Donald's Vacation (1940)
Old MacDonald Duck (1941)
Chef Donald (1941)

Volume 3: Starring Goofy
All of the shorts on here feature Goofy.
The Art of Skiing (1941)
How to Fish (1942)
How to Swim (1942)
Baggage Buster (1941)
How to Dance (1953)
Lion Down (1951)
The Big Wash (1948)
Hold That Pose (1950)
Father's Day Off (1953)

Volume 4: Starring Chip 'N Dale
All of the shorts on here feature Chip 'N' Dale.
Chip an' Dale (1947)
Three for Breakfast (1948)
Food for Feudin' (1950) 
Out On a Limb (1950)
Chicken in the Rough (1951)
Out of Scale (1951)
Two Chips and a Miss (1952)
Working for Peanuts (1953)
Dragon Around (1954)

Wave Two
The second wave of three releases came on May 31, 2005. Each release has a theme.

Volume 5: Extreme Sports Fun
All of the shorts on here feature sports.
Canine Caddy (1941)
How to Play Baseball (1942)
The Hockey Champ (1939)
Double Dribble (1946)
How to Play Football (1944)
Mickey's Polo Team (1936)
Tennis Racquet (1949)
Goofy Gymnastics (1949)

Volume 6: Extreme Music Fun
All of the shorts on here feature music.
Mickey's Grand Opera (1936)
Music Land (1935)
Orphans' Benefit (1934)
Farmyard Symphony (1938)
Pluto's Blue Note (1947)
How to Dance (1953)
Woodland Café (1937)
Donald's Dilemma (1947)

Volume 7: Extreme Adventure Fun
All of the shorts on here feature adventure.
Mickey's Trailer (1938)
No Sail (1945)
Good Scouts (1938)
Hello Aloha (1952)
Old Sequoia (1945)
How to Ride a Horse (1941)
Trailer Horn (1950)
Two Weeks Vacation (1952)

Wave Three
The third wave of two releases came on September 27, 2005. Each release has a holiday theme.

Volume 8: Holiday Celebration with Mickey & Pals
All of the shorts on here are holiday-themed.
Mickey's Good Deed (1932)
Peculiar Penguins (1934)
The Clock Watcher (1945)
Rescue Dog (1947)
Corn Chips (1951)
Lend a Paw (1941)
Toy Tinkers (1949)

Volume 9: Classic Holiday Stories
All of the shorts on here are holiday-themed.
The Small One (1978)
Pluto's Christmas Tree (1952)
Mickey's Christmas Carol (1983)

Wave Four
The fourth wave of four releases came on April 11, 2006. Each release focuses on a pair of characters.

Volume 10: Best Pals: Mickey & Minnie
All of the shorts on here feature Mickey Mouse and Minnie Mouse.
First Aiders (1944)
Bath Day (1946)
Pluto and the Gopher (1950)
Figaro and Frankie (1947)
Mickey's Rival (1936)
The Nifty Nineties (1941)
Pluto's Sweater (1949)
Mickey's Delayed Date (1947)

Volume 11: Best Pals: Donald & Daisy
All of the shorts on here feature Donald Duck and Daisy Duck.
Mr. Duck Steps Out (1940)
Cured Duck (1945)
Donald's Double Trouble (1946)
Sleepy Time Donald (1947)
Crazy Over Daisy (1950)
Donald's Dream Voice (1948)
Donald's Crime (1945)
Donald's Diary (1954)

Volume 12: Best Pals: Mickey & Pluto
All of the shorts on here feature Mickey Mouse and Pluto.
Pluto's Housewarming (1947)
Pluto and the Armadillo (1943)
Cat Nap Pluto (1948)
Pluto's Party (1952)
Pluto, Junior (1942)
Pluto's Fledgling (1948)
Plutopia (1951)
Pueblo Pluto (1949)

Disney-related lists
Short film compilations
Home video lines
Disney home video releases